Vindinge may refer to:

Vindinge, Nyborg Municipality, a village in Southern Denmark
Vindinge, Roskilde Municipality, a village in Zealand, Denmark